NIPPV may refer to:
 Non-invasive positive pressure ventilation, a term used to distinguish non-invasive ventilation that does not use negative pressure (iron lung)
 Nasal intermittent positive pressure ventilation